Korkeakoski is a village and administrative center of the Juupajoki municipality in Pirkanmaa, Finland. It has a population of 822. It is located along Highway 58 between Orivesi and Kärsämäki, and the Tampere–Haapamäki railway runs through its center.

In Korkeakoski there is  a municipal hall, a health center, a school for grades 3-9 and a Sale grocery store. Finland's first mechanized shoe factory called Wallenius Wapriikki, founded in 1898, is also located in Korkeakoski.

See also 
 Korkeakoski railway station

References

External links 
 Korkeakoski at Fonecta

Villages in Finland